RMS Majestic was a White Star Line ocean liner working on the North Atlantic run, originally launched in 1914 as the Hamburg America Line liner SS Bismarck.

The third and largest member of German HAPAG Line's trio of transatlantic liners, her completion was delayed by World War I. The liner never sailed under the German flag except on her sea trials in 1922. Following the war, she was finished by her German builders, handed over to the allies as war reparations and became the White Star Line flagship RMS Majestic, as well as replacing the sunk HMHS Britannic. She was the second White Star ship to bear the name, the first being the RMS Majestic of 1889. 

She served successfully throughout the 1920s but the onset of the Great Depression made her increasingly unprofitable. She managed to struggle through the first half of the 1930s before being sold off for scrapping to Thos. W. Ward. She was taken possession of by the British Admiralty before demolition commenced after an agreement was reached with White Star and Thomas Ward. She served the Royal Navy as the training ship HMS Caledonia before catching fire in 1939 and sinking. She was subsequently raised and scrapped in 1943.

Conception and construction

At the beginning of the 1910s, the German shipping companies aspired to regain the domination which had been theirs at the very beginning of the 20th century, and which had been taken from them by the liners of the Cunard Line and the Oceanic Steam Navigation Company (White Star Line), in particular , RMS Mauretania and the Olympic-class ships. It was under these circumstances that Albert Ballin, president of Hamburg America Line (HAPAG) who was close to Kaiser Wilhelm II, decided to build three liners intended to be the largest in the world. After considering having the first built by German shipyards, and the next two by the British Harland & Wolff shipyards, he decided to strengthen the patriotic symbolism carried by the trio by having all three built in Germany.

For these three liners, size and comfort were given priority. Ballin was aware that his ships could not compete with their British rivals in terms of speed. He thought of compensating for this problem by offering passengers a higher level of luxury, and called on architect Charles Mewès, who was famous for his decoration of luxury hotels. The ships were intended to transport a large number of passengers, and divided not into three classes, as is generally the case, but instead four, the last being intended for the mass transport of immigrants. The sinking of RMS Titanic, which occurred during the construction of the first of the liners in the series, highlighted the need for enough lifeboats for all passengers, which was a real challenge for ships intended to carry more than 5,000 people in total. The builders therefore distributed the boats in several places on the ships, and more exclusively at the level of the upper deck.

On June 10, 1913, the first ship of the Imperator-class trio, made its maiden voyage. The second, a slightly larger liner, SS Vaterland, did the same in May 1914. The last of the trio was decided to be named Bismarck. Her keel was laid shortly after the launch of the Vaterland, in the spring of 1913, in the Blohm & Voss shipyards in Hamburg, Germany, under the watchful eyes of Kaiser Wilhelm II. The original project called for the Bismarck to be similar to the Vaterland, which itself differed from the Imperator in several ways, including the fact that the ducts of its chimneys did not descend into the center of the ship, but split into smaller pipes that run along its sides, allowing for larger interior spaces. Bismarck was intended to be the same size as Vaterland, in both tonnage and length, but a miscommunication that Cunard's  would be larger made HAPAG demand an extra  in length, increasing her gross tonnage. This purported news had already prompted the company to bolt an eagle-shaped figurehead to the Imperator in order to gain some precious meters. In reality, Aquitania was  shorter than both Vaterland and Bismarck. As an employee of HAPAG noted with annoyance, these six feet were particularly expensive, since they required a total revision of the plans and the addition of two couples in the center of the ship to allow this modification of the structure.

Bismarck was launched on 20 June 1914 by Countess Hanna von Bismarck, the granddaughter of the 19th century German Chancellor Otto von Bismarck. During the launching ceremony Countess Bismarck had difficulty breaking the bottle of champagne herself by swinging it too late and Kaiser Wilhelm II had to assist by quick-wittedly snatching the bottle that had missed the ship's hull and throwing it himself, finally causing it to break.

Early history
After launch, fitting out of Bismarck proceeded until the start of the First World War in August 1914, when it slowed and substantive work on the vessel stopped altogether. Other than maintenance work, not much more work was done on the vessel, as naval priorities occupied the ship yard until 1918. By the time the war was over, the funnels had still not been erected. During the war, brass and copper components were scavenged from the Bismarck for munitions. After being ceded to Britain under the terms of the Treaty of Versailles, the as-yet uncompleted ship was purchased jointly by the White Star and Cunard Lines, together with Imperator. Construction of the ship resumed after the end of World War I. Bismarck was ostensibly a replacement for the pre-war 48,000-ton  Britannic which was lost after hitting a mine in the Aegean in 1916, while the Imperator went to Cunard and became the RMS Berengaria, a replacement for the Lusitania which had been sunk by a German U-boat in 1915.

After Bismarck was handed to the White Star Line, a team of engineers were sent by Harland and Wolff, White Star's shipbuilders, to supervise completion of the vessel and gather experience on her operation. Two thousand workers were mobilized on the vessel, which underwent some modifications. The company requested to modify its original propulsion (powered by coal-burning boilers) to consume fuel oil instead, which was more economical. On 5 October 1920, the as-yet uncompleted Bismarck was damaged by fire whilst fitting out at the shipyard and badly damaged. At the time of the fire substantial progress had been made on the vessel and sabotage by shipyard workers was suspected. A number of other German liners that were due to be handed over were also damaged by fire. In February 1921, the assignment of the ship to the White Star was confirmed, and its name was quickly announced: Majestic, in reference to a previous liner of the same name. The ship's funnels were installed in late May and early June 1921, then work focused on the interiors. Here too, important changes were made with regard to the distribution of passengers. To adapt to a curtailment of migration, the fourth class was abolished, and the ship was decided to carry less than 1,000 emigrants and a total of just over 2,000 passengers, far from the 4,000 of the capacity of the Imperator.

The Bismarck was completed on 28 March 1922, and Commodore Bertram Hayes and a number of officers were ordered to Hamburg to take command of the vessel prior to the physical handover. The transition, though not friendly, was not openly acrimonious. When Hayes and his men arrived, they found their quarters incomplete, whereas their German colleagues' cabins were finished perfectly. In the case of Captain Hayes, his temporary quarters were being used to store wash basins. These small events bore witness to the climate of tension that accompanied the handover of the ship. She was taken on her sea trials by Captain Hans Ruser of the Hamburg America Line on the afternoon of 28 March 1922. The shipbuilders completed the ship in the colors of the Hamburg-America Line and with the name Bismarck painted on her bow and stern. As she departed the Hamburg docks the following day she was watched by a large number of locals in silence. Once down the river, she anchored at Cuxhaven for the night and commenced her trials proper the next day. The basic requirement was that the ship develop  and therefore she was steamed for three hours into the North Sea and back again.  Briefly she ran aground after leaving at Pagensand, Schleswig-Holstein, but was refloated on the peak of high tide on 30 March and under way again. After another week of work on the accommodation, Bismarck was accepted by the British representatives. In early April a chartered steamer arrived at Hamburg with the bulk of her new British crew; they were conveyed on board on one side of the ship, while her German crew were taken off on the other side. Upon boarding, men started re-painting the funnels in White Star colours, and painting out the name "Hamburg, Bismarck, replacing it with "Liverpool, Majestic." Majestic departed Hamburg on 9 April 1922 and arrived at Southampton at 9 am the next day (10 April). As a curiosity, exactly ten years earlier, the  left Southampton at the same day, three hours later on her maiden voyage.

Career history

Upon arrival in Southampton, the Majestic became the flagship of the White Star Line fleet. She sailed on her maiden voyage from Southampton on Wednesday, 11 May 1922 at 11:30 am under the command of Sir Bertram Hayes.

On 4 August 1922, Majestic arrived at Southampton and her crew were told that the next day they would be departing and anchoring off Cowes, where they would be inspected by the British monarchs George V and Queen Mary. Over night the ship was cleaned, and the next day she arrived at Cowes at 9:00. Not long after arriving a "yeoman of Signals" from the Royal Yacht arrived with the Royal Standard. The launch carrying the King and Queen arrived shortly after 11:00 am and the Royal Standard was broken on the main mast as the visitors came aboard. The guests were received by Harold A Sanderson – the Chairman of the International Merchant Marine, owners of the White Star Line and Majestics captain, Bertram Hayes. They were given an inspection of the ship lasting an hour and a half, viewing the major public rooms and the three classes of accommodation before sitting down to lunch on B-Deck. The visit to a merchant ship by a reigning monarch was considered a great honour at the time; George V had been a naval officer until placed in the direct line of succession by the death of his brother, and took an interest in the merchant marine.

During the 1920s, the Majestic proved to be extremely popular. After her May 1922 maiden voyage Majestic became one of the most booked liners afloat, carrying more passengers in 1923 than any other Atlantic liner. She carried more passengers than her sister ships in 1924, 1926, 1928 and 1930, and earned the affectionate nickname 'Magic Stick' from her crews and passengers.

This promising career was nevertheless disturbed by various incidents, in particular a collision with the Berengaria at the end of 1922, without serious consequences. However, the biggest problem experienced by the Majestic came in December 1924, when, due to a structural defect in her topsides, Majestic suffered a  crack and had to undergo permanent repairs and strengthening along B-deck before returning to service in April 1925. Small cracks were also noted on her sister Leviathan around the same time, but only minor repairs were carried out and she developed a similar 100-foot crack five years later. The end of the 1920s saw the Majestic undergo several refits, notably in 1928, in order to adapt the ship to the exhaustion of migratory currents on the North Atlantic. As on other ships of the time, the solution took the form of a tourist class that replaced the second class.

In 1925, Majestic completed an eastbound crossing at 25 knots, which was the fastest she ever managed, and faster than either of her sisters' best efforts. However, her older sister Leviathan often had a slightly higher average speed each year than her sister.

When the Great Depression of 1929 struck, the White Star Line was already weakened by the mismanagement of Lord Kylsant, its president for several years. Despite the success of the Majestic and the Olympic, the company adapted to new circumstances. The two ships then alternated between their transatlantic service and short cruises. The Majestic sometimes left New York for three to four day recreational cruises to Halifax, Nova Scotia. In these times of Prohibition in the United States, the Majestic also sometimes went on "cruises to nowhere" in order to allow its American passengers to drink alcohol during very short voyages out of territorial waters.

At the beginning of the 1930s, and while passengers became increasingly scarce, the Majestic began to suffer from repeated onboard fires, due to the poor quality of her electrical installation. This type of incident was also frequent on the Berengaria with often devastating effects, but the damage remained limited on board the Majestic. However, her structural problems continued to manifest themselves in the form of small cracks noted in the area of the ship already affected since 1924. The situation of the company worsened at the same time, although the Majestic found itself briefly in the limelight in 1932, when it transported the British delegation to the Olympic Games in Los Angeles.

Berengaria and Majestic remained jointly owned by Cunard/White Star until 1932, when Cunard terminated the joint ownership agreement. As the situation of the British shipping companies worsened, the British government managed to put pressure on White Star Line and Cunard Line in order to merge them, which happened in 1934. The Majestic was among the ships that avoided being sent to the scrapyard that year. She initially continued her service. In 1934 an enormous wave smashed over the bridge of Majestic in the North Atlantic, injuring the first officer and White Star's final commodore Edgar J. Trant, who was hospitalised for five weeks and never sailed again.

It was during this time that the question of the conservation of the Majestic arose. Cuts were made to try to limit spending. The Majestics à-la-carte restaurant was closed down and its kitchen equipment immediately sold; however, this was not enough to reduce the running costs, and the company decided to dispose of one of the two giants initially built for HAPAG. The Berengaria being older, and suffering more problems due to its electrical installation, it seemed logical that it should be sold for scrapping first. However, it turned out that operating the Majestic cost significantly more, and the need for further hull repairs remained a likely possibility. It was therefore decided that Majestic be withdrawn from service, after her final crossing on 13 February 1936, following only fourteen years in service.

HMS Caledonia

After being laid up at Southampton, she was sold on 15 May 1936 for £115,000 to Thos. W. Ward for scrap. Her funnels and masts were shortened to allow her to pass under the Forth Bridge, in preparation for her last voyage. However, due to a stipulation in her original agreement of being a prize of war handed over to the White Star Line as compensation for lost tonnage, she could not be sold to Thos W. Ward, so an exchange was set up where the British Admiralty would take possession of the Majestic and give the shipbreakers twenty-four outmoded destroyers as compensation for the equivalent scrap value of Majestic. In August 1936 the ship was converted into a Boys' and Artificers' training ship and renamed HMS Caledonia. This transformation involved major changes to the liner's facilities: the lounges were transformed into gymnasiums and messes. Once their partitions had been removed, the luxury cabins became classrooms; the cadets would sleep in hammocks. The radio room was enlarged in order to train large numbers of future operators, and anti-aircraft guns were also installed for training. Only the Pompeian-style swimming pool remained unchanged. This conversion cost the Royal Navy £472,000. The ship was then the largest in the British navy and could accommodate 2,500 people.
On 8 April 1937, Caledonia departed Southampton for her new base in Rosyth, and was commissioned on 23 April 1937 with a capacity of 1,500 trainees. The conversion of the liner allowed for 100 Officers, 180 Chief Petty officers and petty officers, 300 ship's company, 1500 Seamen Boys and 500 Artificer Apprentices to be accommodated on board. By the end of 1937 there were 800 Seamen Boys and 230 Apprentices on the ship's books. At the peak of her training career during 1938–1939, her books were full.

After the outbreak of World War II, the trainees were removed to accommodation ashore and the ship's berth was emptied for naval use. Caledonia was temporarily anchored in the Firth of Forth pending a decision as to her disposal. On 29 September 1939, Caledonia caught fire and burnt out, sinking at her moorings. Her wreck was determined to be beyond repair and the British Admiralty sold the wreck in March 1940 to Thos W. Ward for scrap. However, she was not immediately taken to the scrapyard, and between 1940 and 1943 the wreck's superstructure was scrapped in order to lighten her as well as the sealing of underwater openings. It was not until 17 July 1943 that the hull was raised and towed to the scrapyard in Inverkeithing. The hull was completely scrapped by 1944. The bell was later placed in St Nicholas Church, Dereham.

Characteristics

Technical aspects
The Majestic was the largest ship of her time, measuring 291.3 meters long by 30.5 meters at its widest point, and was assessed at 56,551 gross register tons. The liner had two masts and three funnels. The first two were used to evacuate the smoke produced by the boilers, while the third funnel was used to ventilate engine rooms. Contrary to the usual practice, and according to what has been tested on the Vaterland, the smoke was not evacuated by large ducts passing through the heart of the ship, but by thinner ducts passing inside its sides. This allowed much larger space for passengers inside the ship.

The Majestic was propelled by a set of quadruple propellers driven by four direct drive Parsons turbines. The port centre propeller shaft was driven by a high-pressure turbine, which exhausted to an intermediate pressure turbine that drove the starboard centre shaft. These two turbines were located in the forward watertight compartment. Exhaust from the intermediate turbine was divided equally and fed into two low-pressure turbines on the outer shafts located in a separate compartment aft. The steam turbines generated approximately  when running at 180 rpm. Each one of the low-pressure turbines weighed 375 tons. Steam was supplied to the turbines at 260 psi by 48 Yarrow & Normand water-tube boilers located in four watertight compartments. Bismarck was originally designed to burn coal but was converted to oil while being completed at Blohm & Voss. The ship could reach a maximum speed of 25 knots, among the fastest of its time but still slower than the Mauretania.

Majestic’s main problem was her electrical installation. The cables of German origin installed on the liner and her sister ships suffered from electrical fires, an issue which also plagued the career of the Berengaria (ex-Imperator), whose facilities were several times partially ravaged by fire, eventually leading to her withdrawal from service. As far as the Majestic was concerned, incidents remained limited during its commercial career; however, it was this wiring which triggered the fire onboard the liner after her transformation into a military training ship in September 1939. The Vaterland was the only sister ship to escape these incidents; her entire electrical installation was modified when the Americans took ownership of her and renamed her Leviathan.

Facilities
Similar to her two sister ships, the then-named Bismarck was originally designed to offer four classes to its more than 4,000 passengers traveling in conditions ranging from the luxurious Imperial Suite with veranda to the steerage dormitories. In the early 1920s, however, the United States began to tighten its conditions of access to migrants. The accommodation capacity of the Majestic when it entered service in 1922 was modified to carry 700 passengers in first class, 545 in second, and 850 in third. Its accommodation was revised in 1926 to accommodate a tourist class, which completely replaced the second class in 1931.

The interior of the ship was designed by Charles Mewès prior to the start of World War I, but he died in 1914 and never saw the completed ship. Despite this, his plans were suitable for the White Star Line, which did not adapt them until shortly before the ship was put into service. This design was distinguished in particular by its dining room spread over two decks, then the largest ever built on a ship, as well as by its large living room decorated with oak panels, which gave it an aspect similar to the lounge on board , but in much larger dimensions. Another striking installation on the ship was its swimming pool decorated in a Pompeian style, which contrasted with the sober basin installed on the Olympic-class ships. The liner also offered other meeting places for passengers, in particular a veranda café and an à-la-carte restaurant for passengers who wanted meals different from those offered in the main dining room. While the first class cabins and facilities were located in the center of the ship, the second class offered cabins with two to four berths, located aft of the first class. Finally, the third-class facilities extended over three decks, right at the stern.

Gallery

References

Bibliography

Further reading 

 RMS Majestic – The 'Magic Stick', by Mark Chirnside
 Bismarck/Majestic in Atlantic Liners: A Trio of Trios, by J. Kent Layton
 
 Fox, Robert, Liners, the Golden Age, 1999, Könemann
 McAuley, Robert, The Liners, 1997, Boxtree
 Miller, William H. Jr., The First Great Ocean Liners in Photographs, 1984, Dover
 Louden-Brown, Paul, The White Star Line: An Illustrated History 1869–1934, 2001, Titanic Historical Society
 De Kerbrech, Richard,  Ships of the White Star Line, 2009, Ian Allan Publishing
 Bertram Hayes, Hull Down: Reminiscences of Wind-Jammers, Troops and Travellers, 1923, Cassell

External links 
 White Star Liner Majestic ("Marine Engineering and Shipping Age" pp. 734–738, October 1921)
 Mark Chirnside's Majestic Page
 Majestic Home at Atlantic Liners
 Majestic at the White Star Line History Site 
 Chris' Cunard Page
 
 The Great Ocean Liners: Majestic 
 Cabin Liners: R.M.S. Majestic Interior Tour
 "Docking The World's Great Liners" Popular Mechanics, May 1930, article on docking large ships in the first half of the 20th century featuring RMS Majestic
 A 1922 White Star Line brochure advertising the Majestic

 

1914 ships
Ships of the White Star Line
Ships of the Hamburg America Line
Imperator-class ocean liners
Rogue wave incidents
Maritime incidents in 1922
Maritime incidents in 1934
Maritime incidents in September 1939